The second season of the American streaming television series Jessica Jones, which is based on the Marvel Comics character of the same name, follows Jones as she takes on a new case after the events surrounding her encounter with Kilgrave. It is set in the Marvel Cinematic Universe (MCU), sharing continuity with the films and other television series of the franchise. The season was produced by Marvel Television in association with ABC Studios and Tall Girls Productions, with Melissa Rosenberg serving as showrunner.

Krysten Ritter stars as Jones, with Rachael Taylor, Carrie-Anne Moss, and Eka Darville also returning from the first season, as well as Wil Traval and David Tennant in guest roles. They are joined by J. R. Ramirez, Terry Chen, Leah Gibson, and Janet McTeer. The second season was ordered in January 2016, with filming beginning in April 2017, back-to-back with the miniseries The Defenders. Filming concluded in September 2017.

The season was released on March 8, 2018. It received mostly positive reviews from critics, who once again praised Ritter's performance and the series' female focus but felt the season suffered from pacing issues and a lack of a compelling villain after Tennant's Kilgrave from the first season. A third season of Jessica Jones was ordered on April 12, 2018.

Episodes

Cast and characters

Main
 Krysten Ritter as Jessica Jones
 Rachael Taylor as Patricia "Trish" Walker
 Eka Darville as Malcolm Ducasse
 J. R. Ramirez as Oscar Arocho
 Terry Chen as Pryce Cheng
 Leah Gibson as Inez Green
 Carrie-Anne Moss as Jeri Hogarth
 Janet McTeer as Alisa Jones

Recurring
 Hal Ozsan as Griffin Sinclair
 Maury Ginsberg as Steven Benowitz
 Kevin Chacon as Vido Arocho
 Rebecca De Mornay as Dorothy Walker
 John Ventimiglia as Eddy Costa
 Lisa Tharps as Ruth Sunday
 Callum Keith Rennie as Karl Malus
 Eden Marryshow as Shane Ryback

Notable guests
 Wil Traval as Will Simpson
 Elden Henson as Foggy Nelson
 Daniel Marcus as Maury Tuttlebaum
 David Tennant as Kilgrave
 Rob Morgan as Turk Barrett
 Tijuana Ricks as Thembi Wallace

Production

Development
In January 2015, Netflix COO Ted Sarandos stated that Jessica Jones the series was "eligible to go into multiple seasons for sure" and Netflix would look at "how well [they] are addressing both the Marvel fanbase but also the broader fanbase" in terms of determining if additional seasons would be appropriate. In July 2015, Sarandos said some of the Defender series would "selectively have multiple seasons as they come out of the gate," with series showrunner Melissa Rosenberg saying she was hopeful Jessica Jones would get an additional season before The Defenders. Rosenberg later expanded on this, saying that Marvel Television and Netflix were working out the placement of a potential second season, though "[i]t might not be possible from a logistical standpoint" to have a second season of Jessica Jones debut before The Defenders; Sarandos later confirmed this to be the case, stating that the season would air after The Defenders released in 2017. On January 17, 2016, Netflix ordered a second season of 13 episodes. Raelle Tucker joined the season as an executive producer and writer, replacing Liz Friedman from the first season, who departed the series to work on the pilot for the ABC series, Conviction.

Writing
Rosenberg and the season's writers were halfway through the writing process by August 2016, with the scripts completed by the end of October 2016. Writing during the 2016 United States presidential election, Rosenberg noted she "was just so " and that she and the writing team tried to tap "into the rage Hillary [Clinton] must have felt every day" for the characters. With The Defenders releasing before the season, Rosenberg used the miniseries as an opportunity to help "set up" elements for the season, working with The Defenders executive producers and writers Doug Petrie and Marco Ramirez to do so.

Rosenberg wanted to "continue with [the Jessica Jones] character" in the season, saying, "She's a very damaged character, her damage goes beyond [David Tennant's] Kilgrave. There's a lot to mine from in her backstory and in her present day situation". Actress Krysten Ritter said that the second season would evolve from the first and that, for Jones, "The first season was in her head and the second season is in her heart," adding that Jones "is in a pretty dark headspace" at the beginning of the season and that the season would be "more of an emotional thriller this time." On whether Tennant could return for the second season, Rosenberg said, "Sure, when you have David Tennant, you want him around forever....But the show is called Jessica Jones and the story is about Jessica's arc and how does that play out in its best form?" It was noted that Kilgrave would be "hard to top", though, with Marvel Television head Jeph Loeb saying, "One of the things that's important about any Marvel show is your hero is often defined by how strong your antagonist is," with Rosenberg adding that the objective for the new villain, or villains, for the season would be not to match or do what was done with Kilgrave. As Kilgrave does appear in the season, Rosenberg felt it was important to have him return to "be that mirror again" for Jones, as he is "such a part of her construction and her dilemma".

Rosenberg also hoped to "further expand on the ensemble and on Jessica's world" by giving more screen time to supporting characters, noting that in the first season, "the trick of a show that's called Jessica Jones [is if] she's not in the scene, it's not a guarantee that scene will end up in the final picture. You have to earn secondary character stories. You have to flesh them out enough so that they can eventually carry stories of their own" in future seasons. She also wanted to continue to explore the relationship between Jones and Trish Walker, stating "That is the core relationship in the piece. It is about female friendship, it is about how friends evolve—they're sisters, really—and it's about how they evolve and ping off each other." On Jones becoming famous after her heroics in the first season, Ritter said, "She keeps her circle small because she doesn't want people in her life, so there's no textbook on how to deal with new popularity or new eyes on you." Speaking on the social issues she hoped to tackle in the season, after covering "issues of choice, interracial relationships, domestic violence, [and] issues of consent" while also exploring "feminism and being a woman in this world" in the first, Rosenberg said, "I'm not quite sure yet what the social issues are that we're dealing with [in season 2]. We're just trying to find some resonance for [Jessica Jones] and a new place to push her, to give Krysten something new to play and really push the boundaries of the character." 

After much of the first season was taken from the Alias comic book, Rosenberg wanted to continue that trend with the second season, but she acknowledged that "the MCU is very different from the comics in terms of its mythology. In the books there were things building towards "Civil War" and all that, and here that's not the case. The nature of that is we're probably not going to be able to continue to do parallel storylines [to Alias]". On having Jones continue to struggle with the same issues in the second season, Loeb said, "The end of the [first season]—and it was one of the things that was very important when we talked about the end of the first [season]—was that it wasn't, 'Ooh, I triumphed and now I can get in my hovercar and join the Avengers.' That wasn't the story we were interested in telling." Rosenberg elaborated by comparing the Jessica Jones to her previous series Dexter, saying that she learned "you can advance the character, but you never want to cure the character. With Dexter, the moment he felt guilt or accepted that he was 'bad,' the show's over. He's no longer a sociopath. The equivalent for us would be if Jessica somehow recovered from the damage that had been done to her. People don't just heal". She added that Jones' killing of Kilgrave at the end of the first season was "a life changing experience" and something that would affect the character going forward. Rosenberg also stated that the season would be "about digging deeper into this chaos and peeling back those layers [of Jones' life], just going to the core of her being" after the first season focused on Jones' trauma and facing her abuser.

Casting
After the season was ordered, several main cast members revealed that they would return for the second season, including Ritter as Jessica Jones, Rachael Taylor as Patricia "Trish" Walker, and Carrie-Anne Moss as Jeri Hogarth. Eka Darville also reprises his role as Malcolm Ducasse. In March 2017, J. R. Ramirez was cast as Oscar Arocho, which was revealed in July after the airing of his character's death on Power. In April 2017, Janet McTeer was cast in an undisclosed role, described as someone who has "an enormous impact on Jessica's life." She was revealed to be playing Alisa Jones, Jessica's mother, who was briefly portrayed in flashbacks by Miriam Shor in the first season. By July, Leah Gibson had also joined the cast, in the role of Inez Green. Also joining in the season is Terry Chen as Pryce Cheng.

In August 2017, David Tennant was confirmed to be reprising his role as Kilgrave, appearing as a hallucination, with Wil Traval also returning as Will Simpson. Recurring characters in the season include Rebecca De Mornay reprises her role as Dorothy Walker, Kevin Chacon as Vido Arocho and Callum Keith Rennie as Karl Malus. Elden Henson and Rob Morgan reprise their roles as Foggy Nelson and Turk Barrett from previous Marvel Netflix series, respectively.

Filming
Filming began the week of April 3, 2017 in New York City, once again using the working title Violet. This followed the end of production on The Defenders in March, with Ritter having indicated in May 2016 that the season would film back-to-back with The Defenders. Filming occurred at the Long Island Aquarium and Exhibition Center. Filming for the season wrapped on September 14, 2017.

Approaching the second season, Rosenberg wanted to increase the number of female directors working on the series as a further push for representation. This was a goal that "Marvel was completely on board with", and, given the demand of many talented female directors at the time, the series' producers looked to book only female directors first and approach male directors later in the pre-production phase if needed. Another member of the production suggested that the series book only female directors for the season, which Rosenberg "hadn't contemplated [as a] concept prior to that conversation". She quickly made that the goal of the production and, in October 2016, Rosenberg confirmed that all 13 episodes of the season would be directed by women. Oscar's paintings in the season were created by comic book artist David Mack, who has drawn covers for Jessica Jones comics.

Music
A soundtrack album for the season was released by Hollywood Records and Marvel Music digitally on March 16, 2018, featuring selections of the original score for the season composed by Sean Callery, as well as the original song "I Want Your Cray Cray".

All music composed by Sean Callery.

Marvel Cinematic Universe tie-ins
The season makes several references to the events of Captain America: Civil War, including Vido Arocho's toy Captain America's shield being broken, as well as mention of the Raft prison. The season also mentions the Rand Corporation from Iron Fist.

Marketing
In December 2017, a teaser trailer for the season was released, along with announcing the season release date. A trailer was released on February 7, 2018. Ahead of the season releasing, Netflix revealed the episode titles and creative teams with pulp comic covers for each episode created by women artists. The artists included, in respective order for each episode: Stephanie Hans, Jen Bartel, Elizabeth Torque, Kate Niemczyk, Colleen Doran, Erica Henderson, Audrey Mox, Joyce Chin, Jenny Frison, Amy Reeder, Emanuela Lupacchino, June Brigman, and Annie Wu. The season held its red carpet premiere on March 7, 2018 at the AMC Loews Lincoln Square.

Release
The second season of Jessica Jones was released on March 8, 2018, to coincide with International Women's Day, on the streaming service Netflix worldwide, in Ultra HD 4K and high dynamic range. The season, along with the additional Jessica Jones seasons and the other Marvel Netflix series, was removed from Netflix on March 1, 2022, due to Netflix's license for the series ending and Disney regaining the rights. The season became available on Disney+ in the United States, Canada, United Kingdom, Ireland, Australia, and New Zealand on March 16, ahead of its debut in Disney+'s other markets by the end of 2022.

Critical response
On review aggregator Rotten Tomatoes, the season has an approval rating of 82% with an average rating of 7.00/10, based on 89 reviews. The website's critical consensus reads, "While Jessica Jones is a slower burn with less focus than its inaugural season, its enticing new character arc more fully details the most charismatic Defender." Metacritic, which uses a weighted average, assigned the season a score of 70 out of 100 based on 19 critics, indicating "generally favorable reviews".

In her review of the first five episodes of the season, Allison Keene of Collider gave the season 4 out of 5 stars. She felt "[t]he season really starts to kick into gear.. once we’re introduced to the central mystery: the truth behind IGH," with the season getting "better and better as it goes along." However, as with previous Marvel Netflix series, the season suffered from pacing issues, featuring "a minimal or non-existent score, scenes that go on for too long, and a limited number of edits that add up to everything feeling like it’s happening in real time. It’s not as bad as any other Marvel series on Netflix in this regard — not even close — but it’s still a problem, and one that has unbelievably still not been addressed in terms of episode count (or shorter runtimes within episodes)." Keene also felt the season missed a "driving force" by not having David Tennant back as Kilgrave, but she was glad the season largely ignored the events of The Defenders to focus on Jones and her relationships. Awarding the season a "B", Liz Shannon Miller from IndieWire said the season's all-female directors kept "the show’s noir bent in place though doesn’t push too hard into the realm of art — but the clean approach works, as does Ritter’s always grounded and believable performance." She also enjoyed the Hogarth medical storyline, saying it was "one of the most compelling new storylines", despite it not connecting to the overall larger narrative through the first five episodes. For Miller, Janet McTeer was "the most dynamic element of these early episodes. While she has potential as a foil, there’s not enough of her to keep us hooked, not to mention the lack of the emotional hook that we had with Kilgrave in season 1." Miller also felt the plot lacked direction, and agreed with Keene about the pacing issues.

Digital Spys Jo Berry said in her review, "While the beginning of the new season lacks the focus of the first, and is missing a truly menacing bad guy for Jessica to go up against, the new additions and expanded storylines don't detract from Ritter's powerhouse performance... Pacing quibbles aside, this is a darkly enjoyable return for Jessica Jones, thanks to the strong scripts, slick direction and Ritter's gripping performance." In a more mixed review, The Washington Posts David Betancourt noted the season "lacks shock value". While Ritter "still brings her A-game... It’s the lack of Kilgrave that at first seems to be what’s missing from season 2." He did praise the supporting cast, feeling Darville "has a standout performance" as Malcolm, with his connection to the larger storyline "surprising and enjoyable to watch", and also praising Taylor, adding it "wouldn’t hurt to bring [Taylor] in" as her comics alter ego Hellcat, to help the season that "lags at the beginning".

Conversely, Susana Polo from Polygon was left disappointed and bored by the early episodes, also noting the lack of compelling antagonist for the season. She said, "I don’t see Jessica Jones second season winning over anyone who was lukewarm about her first — or anyone who skipped it entirely. I’m a big fan, and even I left these first five episodes wondering exactly what had happened to the series that gripped me and never let go in 2015."

References

External links
 

2018 American television seasons
02